The .500 Jeffery is a big-game rifle cartridge that first appeared around 1920, and was originally introduced by the August Schuler Company, a German firm, under the European designation "12.7×70mm Schuler" or ".500 Schuler". When offered by the famed British outfitter W.J. Jeffery & Co, it was renamed the .500 Jeffery so as to be more palatable to British hunters and sportsmen following World War One.

History
The .500 Jeffery was introduced to bring firepower comparable to the .505 Gibbs into a standard-sized 1898 Mauser action as used with the 8x57mm and 7x57mm cartridges. The Gibbs and .416 Rigby cartridges required oversized magnum Mauser actions. To shoehorn a large round into the 98 action required a rebated rim.  When introduced, the .500 Jeffery was technically rated as the most powerful rifle cartridge although in reality not quite up to .505 Gibbs' performance. The .505 Gibbs, with greater capacity, can be loaded far in excess of the .500 Jeffery today.

Ammunition availability
Like the .505 Gibbs, the .500 Jeffery is enjoying somewhat of a renaissance among American shooters and African big game hunters in the early 21st century, almost 100 years after its introduction. As of 2009, Norma, Kynoch, Mauser, Corbon, and Westley Richards were offering loaded ammunition in .500 Jeffery with ammunition costing $150 for a box of 20 or more.

Rifles
There have been a few rifles chambered in the .500 Jeffery including Jeffery, Heym, CZ-USA, and a few single shots including the Ruger No. 1, and the Butch Searcy & Co.
Mauser offers its Model 98 magnum in the caliber. Its "elephant" model is offered in .500 Jeffery exclusively. In 2011, Sako began offering the caliber in its Model 85 "safari" rifle using a new XL size action, and since 2014 the XL action has been available in the more affordable Model 85 brown bear rifle. Blaser also offers rifles chambered in the caliber. Many of the modern rifles have feeding issues due to the rebated rim. The original Jeffery uses a single-column two-shot magazine to get around the potential reliability problems resulting from a rebated rim.

Criticism
The .500 Jeffery has had a few issues since its introduction. It has a rather short neck length that can make it difficult to seat bullets with a relatively high sectional density. Also it has a small shoulder. This is not usually an issue but as the .500 Jeffery also has a rebated rim it makes it rather difficult to extract in extreme conditions.

Ballistics
When the .500 Jeffery was first introduced it was loaded to a velocity of  topped off with a 535-grain bullet generating  of muzzle energy, which made it a pretty good hunting caliber for thick-skinned dangerous game. Since then, reloading capabilities have advanced to be able to launch heavier bullets at higher velocities. Also the .600 Nitro Express exceeds the .500 Jeffery in muzzle energy, with 120 grains of cordite.

See also
 .50 BMG
 .500 A-Square
 .500 Nitro Express
 .577 Nitro Express
 .577 Tyrannosaur
 .600 Nitro Express
 .700 Nitro Express
 List of rifle cartridges

References

External links
 African Conservation Foundation on .505 Gibbs and .500 Jeffrey 
 AccurateReloading.Com on the .500 Jeffery
 Norma Ammunition .500 Jeffery page
 RealGuns.com page on .500 Jeffery reloading data
RealGuns: The 500 Jeffery Project (Part I)
RealGuns: The 500 Jeffery Project (Part II)
Kynoch Ammunition

Pistol and rifle cartridges
British firearm cartridges
W.J. Jeffery & Co cartridges